Timur Borisovich Kizyakov (August 30, 1967, Reutov, Moscow Oblast) is a Soviet and Russian TV presenter, author and presenter of the program   (Channel One Russia).

Biography 
Born August 30, 1967 in Reutov.

Since 1988 he has worked in broadcasting the main edition for kids of Soviet Central Television.

Since 1992 — the leading transmission While all the Нouses.

Member of the Academy of Russian Television (ART).

In 2012 he was elected a member of the Public Chamber of the Central Federal District.

In 2016 he joined the supreme council of the party United Russia, the proposal received from the Deputy Secretary of the General Council of Olga Batalina. The party plans to deal with problems of placement of orphans and television (tongue-tied broadcasters and the lack of children's programs).

He is the owner of the company  Videopasport  relieving orphans in movies since 2006 for the category  While all the Нouses  —   You have a baby.  According to the Ministry of Education, for every questionnaire conducted during the tendering company receives 100 000, only 350 questionnaires were made. Parallel  Videopasport  pleaded with other charitable organizations for the rights to the trademark  Videopasport Child, demanding to ban making such survey to other organizations (the cost of which this procedure was 3 000).

Personal life 
Wife  Yelena Kizyakova was born December 18, 1972 in Volgograd. She graduated from the journalism faculty of the Peoples' Friendship University of Russia. They married in 1997. Have two daughters   Yelena (1998), Valentina (2003) and son Timur (2012). His wife Elena leads the program While all the houses categories You will have a child in September 2006.

Awards 
1995:  (best leading)
 2000: TEFI  (best leading)
 2006: Order of Friendship
 2012: Order of Honour
 2015: Prize of the Russian Federation Government in the field of mass media

References

External links
 Биографическая справка

1967 births
Living people
People from Reutov
Soviet television presenters
Russian television presenters
Recipients of the Order of Honour (Russia)
United Russia politicians